Sead Zilić (born 17 September 1982) is a Bosnian retired football player.

He holds Serbian, Bosnian, and Slovenian citizenship.

Club career
He made his debut on the professional league level in the Bundesliga for Hertha BSC on 10 February 2000 when he came on as a substitute in the 45th minute of the game against VfL Wolfsburg. For Wisła Płock he made one appearance in European cup competitions.

He played the latter years of his career in the Austrian lower leagues.

References

External links
 
 
 
 Profile at PrvaLiga 
 Transfers in Austria

1982 births
Living people
People from Prijepolje
Bosniaks of Serbia
Association football forwards
Bosnia and Herzegovina footballers
Hertha BSC players
Hertha BSC II players
FK Sarajevo players
NK Drava Ptuj players
Wisła Płock players
Maccabi Petah Tikva F.C. players
Trikala F.C. players
NK Domžale players
Bundesliga players
Premier League of Bosnia and Herzegovina players
Slovenian PrvaLiga players
Ekstraklasa players
Israeli Premier League players
Football League (Greece) players
Bosnia and Herzegovina expatriate footballers
Expatriate footballers in Germany
Bosnia and Herzegovina expatriate sportspeople in Germany
Expatriate footballers in Slovenia
Bosnia and Herzegovina expatriate sportspeople in Slovenia
Expatriate footballers in Poland
Bosnia and Herzegovina expatriate sportspeople in Poland
Expatriate footballers in Israel
Bosnia and Herzegovina expatriate sportspeople in Israel
Expatriate footballers in Greece
Bosnia and Herzegovina expatriate sportspeople in Greece
Expatriate footballers in Austria
Bosnia and Herzegovina expatriate sportspeople in Austria